Wente is the surname of:

 Bob Wente (1933-2000), American racecar driver
 Edward F. Wente (born 1930), American Egyptologist and professor emeritus
 Margaret Wente (born 1950), Canadian newspaper columnist
 Susan Rae Wente (born 1962), American cell biologist and Provost at Vanderbilt University

See also
 Wente Vineyards, a winery in Livermore, California
 Wente torus, in differential geometry